The Irish Defence Forces Cap Badge (or "FF badge" as it is sometimes called) is common to all services and corps of the Irish Defence Forces. Although principally associated with the Irish Army (Defence Force regulations in fact describe it as "the Army Badge") it is also worn by and appears in elements of the insignia of the Naval Service and Air Corps.

Origin and early usage
  
The badge is said to be designed in 1913 by Eoin MacNeill, a founding member and chairman of the Irish Volunteers, but there is also evidence that points to other origins, notably Canon Peadar O'Leary and The O'Rahilly. Variations existed for territorial commands, but the majority of volunteers wore the Óglaigh na hÉireann badge. It was worn by republicans in the 1916 Easter Rising. It was rarely worn by the Irish Republican Army in the War of Independence as doing so could lead to a prison term. Eventually the Free State Army adopted the badge for their new uniforms before the Irish Civil War.

Description

Design
The design of the Army Badge which is prescribed in Defence Force Regulations as follows:

"...As a component of rank insignia and which is specified in the Third Schedule as the form of the cap badge, shall be  a sunburst - An Gal Gréine, surmounted by an 8-pointed star, a point of the star being uppermost, bearing the letters "FF" (in Gaelic characters) encircled by a representation of an ancient warrior's sword belt on which the words "Óglaigh na hÉireann" are inscribed."

Inscription

"FF" - Fianna Fáil    - "Fianna of Inis Fáil", i.e. Army of Ireland (the political party Fianna Fáil formed in 1926 adopted the same name)
"Óglaiġ na h-Éireann" - ''Irish Volunteers

Current usage and variations

Irish Army
In the Army, the badge is worn by all ranks on all head-dress. Enlisted and non-commissioned ranks wear a "Stay-Brite" anodised aluminium brass replica. Some enlisted ranks, particularly older soldiers, wear the original Brass Badge which, although no longer official issue, is considered a symbol of lengthy service. Commissioned Officers and Senior NCOs, such as Sergeant Major and Battalion/Regimental Quartermaster, wear a larger dark bronze version. This tradition is assumed to have begun on the death of Michael Collins during the Irish Civil War when officers dulled their badges with boot polish in Commemoration of the General. The bronze badge was introduced in 1924.

These two variations are worn by all ranks. However, on the Service Dress Uniform, the ranks of Colonel, Brigadier General, Major General and Lieutenant General and the Head Chaplain have a gold bullion version on a red cloth backing. The same version is worn on the Mess Dress Uniform peaked cap by all officers.

Irish Naval Service
In the Naval Service, the "Stay-Brite" version of the badge is worn by Seamen and Leading Seaman on their cap and on the operational beret.

Irish Air Corps
The Air Corps previously wore army uniforms. On the introduction of a distinct blue Air Corps uniform in 1994, cloth cap badges were introduced for the forage caps and peaked caps; these have a smaller less detailed version of the badge embroidered into the design, which incorporates a phoenix.

See also
Cap badge
Irish Army rank insignia

External links
Irish Military Insignia

References

badge
Irish Defence Forces cap badge
Badges